Saint Petersburg Lions was a professional basketball team in Saint Petersburg, Russia. The team was created in 2000 by a consortium of Italian and Swiss sponsors at the lead of Interperformances basketball agency. They were banned by the Russian Basketball Federation due to their participation in the newly created Euroleague run by Euroleague Basketball Company during the 2000-01 season. The Russian federation had agreed to send its representatives to the SuproLeague, run by FIBA Europe. When the merger of the two competitions the following year occurred, the Lions were dissolved.

Roster
The roster of the Lions in their only season included:
Sergei Bazarevich
Steven Edwards
Derek Hamilton
Keith Jennings
Marijan Kraljević
Stjepan Stazić
Evgeny Kisurin
Head coach: Miodrag Vesković

References

External links
Eurobasket.com page
Euroleague.net page

Defunct basketball teams in Russia
Sports clubs in Saint Petersburg
Basketball teams established in 2000
Basketball teams disestablished in 2001
2000 establishments in Russia
2001 disestablishments in Russia